The 15 cm sIG 33 auf Fahrgestell Panzerkampfwagen II (Sf), sometimes referred to as the Sturmpanzer II Bison, was a German assault gun used during World War II. The dozen vehicles produced were assigned to the 90th Light Infantry Division in North Africa during the war.

Development 
The  sIG 33 gun was used as direct-fire artillery in support of assaulting infantry. To improve its mobility 38 guns were mounted on a Panzerkampfwagen I chassis in February 1940. The 15 cm sIG 33 (Sf) auf Panzerkampfwagen I Ausf B that had participated in the Invasion of France in 1940 had proven to be too heavy for its chassis as well as being enormously tall.

The same gun was mated to the Panzerkampfwagen II chassis in an attempt to drastically lower its height while using a stronger chassis. The prototype used a standard Panzer II Ausf. B chassis when it was built in February 1941, but this was too cramped for use. Its sides were notably lower than the front, which made the crew vulnerable to small arms fire and shell fragments. Large hatches were added to the rear deck to better cool the engine. The vehicle carried 30 rounds for the gun which could traverse a total of 5° left and right and used a Rblf36 sight.

Combat use 
Twelve were built in December 1941 — January 1942. They were shipped to North Africa later that year, where they formed schwere Infanteriegeschütz-Kompanien (mot.S.) ("Heavy Self-propelled Infantry Gun Companies") 707 and 708. They were used as close support mobile artillery, with the former assigned to Schützen-Regiment 155 and the latter to Schützen-Regiment 200, both part of the 90. leichte Afrika-Division. Both companies fought until the Axis surrender in Tunisia in May 1943.

References

Notes

Bibliography 
 Chamberlain, Peter, and Hilary L. Doyle. Thomas L. Jentz (Technical Editor). Encyclopedia of German Tanks of World War Two: A Complete Illustrated Directory of German Battle Tanks, Armoured Cars, Self-propelled Guns, and Semi-tracked Vehicles, 1933–1945. London: Arms and Armour Press, 1978 (revised edition 1993) 
Doyle, Hilary Louis, Friedli, Lukas and Jentz, Thomas. Sturmpanzer: Sturminfanteriegeschütz 33, Sturmpanzer and Munitionspanzer Development and Production from 1942 to 1945. Panzer Tracts No. 8-1. Boyds, Maryland: Panzer Tracts, 2014.
Jentz, Thomas L. Rommel's Funnies. Darlington, Maryland: Darlington Productions, 1997. 
 Trojca, Waldemar and Jaugitz, Markus. Sturmtiger and Sturmpanzer in Combat. Katowice, Poland: Model Hobby, 2008

External links 
 Panzers of the Reich
 wwiivehicles.com
 "Gw. II für 15 cm s.I.G. 33: S.P. Heavy Infantry Howitzer " (U.S. World War II intelligence report)

World War II assault guns
150 mm artillery
Military vehicles introduced from 1940 to 1944
World War II self-propelled artillery of Germany
zh:SiG33野牛